Chester Williams Rice (December 16, 1888 – March 8, 1951) was an American electrical engineer who was the joint inventor in 1925 of the moving coil loudspeaker along with Edward W. Kellogg.

Career

Rice was born in Lynn, Massachusetts in 1888 and educated at The Albany Academy and Harvard College, from which he received an S.B. and an M.E.E. in 1911. He was later employed by General Electric in Schenectady, New York.

In 1925, Rice, while working for General Electric, published a paper with Edward W. Kellogg outlining an early moving coil loudspeaker. The paper also discussed a way of boosting power to amplifiers; this was incorporated in General Electric's Radiola line of radios in 1926.

Personal
Rice married Helen Currier of Lynn in 1914. They had five children, Barbara, Wilbur Currier,  Priscilla, Chester Thomson and Helen.

References

External links

1888 births
1951 deaths
American acoustical engineers
People from Lynn, Massachusetts
Harvard School of Engineering and Applied Sciences alumni
General Electric people
20th-century American inventors
The Albany Academy alumni
Fellows of the American Physical Society